Marcel Moisand was a French sailor who competed in the 1900 Summer Olympics. He was a member of the boat Ducky, which took the 5th place in the first race of 1 to 2 ton and the 7th place in the second race of 1 to 2 ton class.

Further reading

References

External links

Sailors at the 1900 Summer Olympics – 1 to 2 ton
French male sailors (sport)
Olympic sailors of France
Year of birth missing
Year of death missing
Sailors at the 1900 Summer Olympics – Open class
Place of birth missing
Place of death missing